Orta Cami Mosque (Crimean Tatar: Orta Cami, Ukrainian: Мечеть Орта-Джамі, Russian: Мечеть Орта-Джами, Turkish: Orta Camii) is one of the oldest mosques in Crimea. It is situated on the modern day Lenina Street in the old town of Bakhchisaray.

It used to be the main Friday prayer mosque in the capital of Crimean Khanate. The earliest known mention of it was in 1674, as a ma'ale mosque (main mosque of the corresponding district). The mosque was in bad condition and its minaret along with some other small surrounding buildings were completely destroyed until the end of 2012 when its reconstruction  started. It is financed by Hajji Enver Umerov - Omer Kirimli family. The reconstruction also involved rebuilding of the minaret from the scratch as well as some minor buildings previously located next to the mosque. Currently, as many years ago, it is once again one of the most important places in Bakhchisaray.

Photos

See also
Religion in Crimea
List of mosques in Ukraine
List of mosques in Russia
List of mosques in Europe

References

Mosques in Bakhchysarai
Religious buildings and structures completed in 1674
17th-century mosques